Jonathan Healy may refer to:
 Jonathan Healy (politician)
 Jonathan Healy (taekwondo)

See also
 John Healy (disambiguation)